Cherry Plain State Park is a  state park located in Rensselaer County, New York in the United States. The park is located in Cherry Plain at the southwest part of the Town of Berlin, near the Massachusetts border. Outdoor recreational opportunities are also available within the Capital District Wildlife Management Area, a  conservation area that nearly surrounds the park.

Park description
Cherry Plain State Park offers a beach, picnic tables with pavilions, a playground, recreation programs, a nature trail, hiking and biking, cross-country skiing, fishing (bass, bullheads and pickerel), ice fishing, and a boat launch with boat rentals. Thirty campsites are available at the park, including ten trailer sites, ten tent sites near Black River Pond, and ten sites that can be reached only by hiking.

Cherry Plain State Park is nearly completely surrounded by the  Capital District Wildlife Management Area, managed by the New York State Department of Environmental Conservation. In addition to wildlife typical of wooded areas, such as white-tailed deer, beaver, and wild turkey, the Capital District Wildlife Management Area also hosts moose, which have recently arrived in the region from neighboring states.

See also
 List of New York state parks

References

External links
 New York State Parks: Cherry Plain State Park
 Trail map of Cherry Plain State Park and Capital District Wildlife Management Area

State parks of New York (state)
Parks in Rensselaer County, New York